Mike Verveer is the common council member from the 4th district on the Madison Common Council. He was first elected in 1995. He was named Common Council President on April 7, 2007. Vereer is affiliated with the Democratic Party.

He appeared on The Daily Show with Jon Stewart in 2004.

References

Year of birth missing (living people)
Living people
Wisconsin city council members
Politicians from Madison, Wisconsin